The 2015 Leinster Senior Football Championship is the 2015 installment of the annual Leinster Senior Football Championship held under the auspices of Leinster GAA. The competition was scheduled to start on 16 May 2015 with Offaly drawn against Longford in the opening game. The final took place 12 July.
Dublin won their tenth Leinster title in 11 years after a 2-13 to 0-6 win against Westmeath.

Teams
The Leinster championship was contested by 11 of the 12 county teams in Leinster, a province of Ireland. Kilkenny was the only county team not to compete.

Preliminary round refs

Quarter-final refs
			
Semi-final refs

Final ref

Semi-finals

Final

References

2L
Leinster Senior Football Championship